Roger Franklin (born September 7, 1990) is an American former basketball player. Born in Duncanville, Texas, he played two years professionally in the Netherlands and Luxembourg.

Professional career
On August 16, 2013, it was announced Franklin would start playing in the Netherlands for Matrixx Magixx.

In June 2014, Franklin signed with Black Star Mersch in Luxembourg.

References

1990 births
Living people
American expatriate basketball people in Luxembourg
American expatriate basketball people in the Netherlands
Basketball players from Texas
Black Star Mersch players
Dutch Basketball League players
Matrixx Magixx players
Oklahoma State Cowboys basketball players
People from Duncanville, Texas
Small forwards
Texas State Bobcats men's basketball players
American men's basketball players